Eugene Lee (born July 16, 1953) is an American actor and playwright. He has appeared in work in Asia and in the United States. He has appeared in guest roles in numerous TV shows such as The White Shadow, Quantum Leap, NYPD Blue and Touched by an Angel.

His stage work includes A Soldier's Play with Denzel Washington and Samuel L. Jackson with the Negro Ensemble Company, a Broadway appearance in August Wilson's Gem of the Ocean, and as a company member for the Kennedy Center's 10-play cycle tribute to Wilson. As a playwright, his works include East Texas Hot Links, Fear Itself, Somebody Called: A Tale of Two Preachers,  Killingsworth, and The Rest of Me.

Filmography

Film

Television

Theater (partial list)

References

External links
 

1953 births
Living people
African-American male actors
Place of birth missing (living people)
American male television actors
21st-century American male actors
21st-century African-American people
20th-century African-American people